Lorenzo L. Shaw (November 8, 1828 – 1907), commonly known as L. L. Shaw, was an American businessman who was active in coastal North Yarmouth, Massachusetts (today's Yarmouth, Maine), in the 19th century. He was the co-founder of Freeman, Shaw & Co., a cotton mill, and of Pumgustuck Water Company.

Career
After moving to Maine from his native New Hampshire, Shaw was a selectman in Lewiston, Maine. He resigned in 1865, two years after the town's incorporation.

In the late 19th century, Shaw and other "dignified citizens", like Doctor James Bates and Barnabas Freeman, often assembled for an evening's chat at Englishman James Parsons' grocery store, after picking up their mail at the post office next door. This was to the east of the former Goff's hardware store at 90 Main Street.

In 1871, Freeman joined forces with Shaw to start up a cotton mill, where today's Sparhawk Mill now stands, under the name Freeman, Shaw & Co. After Freeman retired in 1888, Shaw ran the mill on his own until his death in 1907, during which time the mill's tower was completed. On June 25, 1878, a diagram of a warping machine patent filed by Shaw appeared in the Official Gazette of the United States Patent Office.

Shaw lived in a carriage house at the eastern corner of Yarmouth's Main and Bridge Streets. It burned down in 1967, replaced by today's structure at 121 Main Street.

He was a co-founder of the Pumgustuck Water Company (today's Yarmouth Water District) in 1887, along with Charles H. Weston, John H. Humphrey, Joseph York Hodsdon, E. Dudley Freeman and George W. Hammond. (Pumgustuck means falls at mouth of river.)

Shaw died in 1907, aged 78 or 79. He is interred in Yarmouth's Riverside Cemetery, along with several other notable former citizens of the town.

References

1828 births
1907 deaths
19th-century American businesspeople
20th-century American businesspeople
People from Holderness, New Hampshire
People from North Yarmouth, Maine
People from Yarmouth, Maine
Burials in Maine